In the Battle of Arcole on 15 to 17 November 1796, the French Army of Italy commanded by Napoleon Bonaparte won a victory over the army of Austria led by Jozsef Alvinczi. The battle was part the third relief of the Siege of Mantua in which Alvinczi's army repulsed Bonaparte at the Second Battle of Bassano on 6 November and at the Battle of Caldiero on 12 November. Meanwhile, Paul Davidovich's Austrian Tyrol Corps clashed with Claude Vaubois' French division at Cembra on 2 November. Davidovich defeated Vaubois at the Battle of Calliano on 6–7 November and Rivoli Veronese on 17 November. After Bonaparte's triumph at Arcola, he turned on the Tyrol Corps, beat it at Rivoli on 21 November, and forced it to retreat north into the mountains.

French Army

 Army of Italy: Napoleon Bonaparte (41,560)
 Division: André Masséna (9,540 including 2 cavalry regiments)
 Brigade: Philippe Romaine Ménard
 Brigade: Antoine-Guillaume Rampon
 Brigade: Honoré Vial
 Brigade: Jean Joseph Magdeleine Pijon
 Brigade: Charles Leclerc
 Division: Pierre Augereau (8,340 including 1 cavalry regiment)
 Brigade: Jean-Antoine Verdier
 Brigade: Louis André Bon
 Brigade: Jean Lannes
 Division: Claude-Henri Belgrand de Vaubois (10,500)
 Brigade: Jean Joseph Guieu
 Brigade: Pascal Antoine Fiorella
 Brigade: Gaspard Amédée Gardanne
 Division: Charles Edward Jennings de Kilmaine (8,830 including 1 cavalry regiment)
 Brigade: Louis Chabot
 Brigade: Claude Dallemagne
 Brigade: Thomas Sandos
 Brigade: Claude Lebley
 Brigade: Nicolas Bertin
 Division: François Macquard (2,750 including 1 cavalry regiment)
 Cavalry Reserve: Thomas-Alexandre Dumas (1,600 in 6 cavalry regiments)

Austrian Army

 Field Army: Feldzeugmeister József Alvinczi (c. 51,000, not including Wurmser)
 Friaul Corps: Feldmarschall-Leutnant Peter Quasdanovich (28,699)
 Advance Guard and Reserve:
 Advance Guard: General-major Prince Friedrich Franz Xaver of Hohenzollern-Hechingen (4,397)
 Reserve Brigade: General-major Philipp Pittoni von Dannenfeld (4,376)
 Main Body, 1st Line: Feldmarschall-Leutnant Giovanni Marchese di Provera (9,380)
 Brigade: General-major Gerhard Rosselmini
 Brigade: General-major Anton Lipthay de Kisfalud
 Main Body, 2nd Line: Feldmarschall-Leutnant Provera (8,279)
 Brigade: General-major Anton Schübirz von Chobinin
 Brigade: General-major Adolf Brabeck
 Independent Brigade: General-major Anton Ferdinand Mittrowsky (c. 3,000)
 Tyrol Corps: Feldmarschall-Leutnant Paul Davidovich (19,476)
 Brigade 1: General-major Johann Ludwig Alexius von Loudon (4,277)
 Brigade 2: General-major Joseph Ocskay von Ocsko (4,663)
 Brigade 3: General-major Johann Sporck (2,560)
 Brigades 4 & 5: General-major Josef Philipp Vukassovich (6,880)
 Brigade 6: Oberstleutnant Seulen (1,096)
 Mantua Garrison: Feldmarschall Dagobert von Wurmser (23,708 of whom only 12,240 were fit for service)

Footnotes

References

Printed materials
 Boycott-Brown, Martin. The Road to Rivoli. London: Cassell & Co., 2001. 
 Chandler, David. Dictionary of the Napoleonic Wars. New York: Macmillan, 1979.

External links
 napoleon-series.org Austrian generals by Digby Smith, compiled by Leopold Kudrna
 French Wikipedia, Liste des généraux de la Révolution et du Premier Empire

French Revolutionary Wars orders of battle